Bišćan is a Croatian surname. Notable people with the surname include:

Darijo Biščan (born 1985), Croatian footballer
Frank Biscan (1920−1959), American baseball player
Igor Bišćan (born 1978), Croatian football manager and former player
Tomislav Bišćan (born 1987), Croatian figure skater

See also
 

Croatian surnames